Cut the Rope: Time Travel is a  physics-based puzzle video game developed by ZeptoLab for the iOS, Android and web browsers. A third entry in the Cut the Rope series, it follows Om Nom going through time.

Gameplay
Time Travel shares the main idea with the previous games in the series, where the players must cut the ropes with swipes in order for Om Nom to get the candy. However, the game adds Om Nom's ancestors, which means there are now two candies for two Noms in each level. That leads to the puzzles where the players will have to plan to feed both creatures at the same time.

With each collected piece of candy, the players will gain stars that are equivalent to points; the more stars obtained in a certain level, the more bonus points are earned for other features like super powers, used as a help during the puzzles. By pressing the camera button, the players can view animated stories created by ZeptoLab, offering more info about Om Nom's ancestry.

Centered around time travel, the game consists of various time periods, from the Middle Ages to the Stone Age. Each one of them regularly add new obstacles and mechanisms to be used. Some of those are: the chains can hold up candies requiring to be cut by a blade, freeze button that stops any movement on the screen, bombs that will send everything in its radius up, and others.

Reception

On its release, Cut the Rope: Time Travel was met with "generally favorable" reviews from critics, with an aggregate score of 84/100 on Metacritic.

References

External links
Official website

2013 video games
Video games developed in Russia
Android (operating system) games
IOS games
Puzzle video games
Browser games
Casual games
Single-player video games
ZeptoLab games